Montgomery County Public Schools (MCPS) is the school district serving Montgomery County, Virginia.

Schools

Primary (Grades K-2)
Christiansburg Primary School

Elementary (Grades K-5)
Auburn Elementary School
Belview Elementary School
Christiansburg Elementary School (grades 3-5)
Eastern Montgomery Elementary School
Falling Branch Elementary School
Gilbert Linkous Elementary School
Harding Avenue Elementary School
Kipps Elementary School
Margaret Beeks Elementary School
Price's Fork Elementary School

Middle (Grades 6-8)
Auburn Middle School
Blacksburg Middle School
Christiansburg Middle School
Shawsville Middle School

High Schools (Grades 9-12)
Auburn High School
Blacksburg High School
Christiansburg High School
Eastern Montgomery High School

References

External links

School divisions in Virginia
Education in Montgomery County, Virginia